

Latte macchiato is a coffee beverage. The name means stained or marked milk, which refers to the espresso stain on the milk used. It is a play on "Espresso macchiato". an espresso with a dollop or two of milk or cream.

Related drinks
Latte macchiato differs from caffè latte in several ways. First, in a latte macchiato, espresso is added to milk, rather than milk to espresso as in a caffè latte. Second, a latte macchiato features more foam rather than simply hot milk. A latte macchiato often uses only half an espresso shot or less. Finally, a latte macchiato is often a 'layered' drink, rather than being mixed as in a caffè latte.

In a caffè latte, the emphasis is on the coffee, while in a latte macchiato, the emphasis is on the milk.

The macchia is the little "spot" of crèma left on top of the milk to clearly distinguish that the beverage is a latte macchiato and not a caffè latte, where the espresso traditionally has been added before the milk, hence having no "mark". Conversely, caffè macchiato, another similarly named beverage, is actually espresso "stained" with a small amount of milk.

Preparation
A latte macchiato may be prepared simply by frothing milk, generally producing generous foam, pouring it into a glass, and adding espresso. The frothing is generally extensive, yielding significant light, "dry" foam, with a layer of liquid milk underneath, rather than the "wet" microfoam used in latte art.

Alternatively, it may be prepared as a layered drink, with the espresso gently poured (most gently out of a small espresso brew pitcher, over the back of a spoon) so that it forms a layer between the denser liquid milk below and the lighter foam above. In this case a glass is essential for the layers to be visible.

The espresso may be brewed into a standard espresso cup or shot glass and then swiftly dumped in, or may be brewed into a specialized espresso brew pitcher, which makes pouring easier, particularly for layering.

See also

Caffè macchiato
List of coffee drinks
Steamer (or "babycino") – steamed milk only

Further reading

Coffee drinks
Italian drinks
Coffee in Italy